State Highway 209 (SH 209) is a state highway in Pueblo County, Colorado. SH 209's southern terminus is at U.S. Route 50 (US 50) south of Boone, and the northern terminus is at SH 96 in Boone.

Route description
SH 209 runs , beginning heading perpendicular away from US 50 south of Boone. South Higgins Avenue, what the highway is named at this point, turns slightly from northeast to north as it heads through a farmland terrain. The route crosses the Arkansas River as well as another one of its tributaries before entering Boone. Meeting First Street, the roadway comes to an end without continuation at SH 96, Main Street.

Major intersections

See also

 List of state highways in Colorado

References

External links

209
Transportation in Pueblo County, Colorado